Counting Sheep is a 2022 Spanish-Argentine black comedy film directed by José Corral Llorente, starring Eneko Sagardoy and Natalia de Molina. It is set in 1993 Spain.

Cast

See also 
 List of Spanish films of 2022
 List of Argentine films of 2022

References

External links
 

2022 films
Spanish black comedy films
Argentine black comedy films
Films set in Spain
Films set in 1993
2020s Spanish-language films
2022 black comedy films
2020s Spanish films
2020s Argentine films